Anne P. Canby served in the cabinet of Governor Brendan Byrne as the New Jersey Commissioner of Transportation from 1981 to 1982 and in the cabinet of Governor Thomas R. Carper as the Delaware Secretary of Transportation from 1993 to 2001.  She also served as the Treasurer of the Massachusetts Bay Transportation Authority, and Deputy Assistant Secretary of the U.S. Department of Transportation. She is the President of Surface Transportation Policy Partnership.

A native of Delaware, Canby attended Wheaton College. While serving as Commissioner of Transportation in New Jersey, she would sometimes ride her bicycle from her home in Pennington to her office in Trenton.

References

Living people
Year of birth missing (living people)
New Jersey Commissioners of Transportation
State cabinet secretaries of Delaware
People from Pennington, New Jersey
Wheaton College (Massachusetts) alumni
Place of birth missing (living people)